Kathy Kuykendall (born November 23, 1956) is a former American tennis player.  She was ranked sixth in the United States in 1974, seventh in 1975, and tenth in 1976.  She reached the quarterfinals in the singles event of the French Open in 1976 which she lost in three sets to Florența Mihai.

References

External links 
 
 
 
 Kathy Cooks Up A Tennis Reputation
 Kathy Does Homework: Tennis, Tennis, Tennis

American female tennis players
1956 births
Living people
Tennis players from Houston
21st-century American women